Woosley is an English surname. Notable people with the surname include:
 Belinda Woosley, Australian swimmer
 Louisa Woosley, the first woman ordained as a minister in any Presbyterian denomination
 Raymond L. Woosley, founding president and chairman of the board for AZCERT
 Stanford E. Woosley, director of the Center for Supernova Research at University of California, Santa Cruz
 Tiffany Woosley, professional basketball player

See also 
 Wolseley

Surnames of English_origin